Avaz Temirkhan (born 1 April 1959) is an Azerbaijani politician who has served as the chairman of the Azerbaijan Liberal Party.

References 

Living people
1959 births
Azerbaijan Liberal Party politicians
People from Barda, Azerbaijan